Serkan may refer to:

People
 Serkan Atak (born 1984), German footballer of Turkish descent
 Serkan Aykut (born 1975), Turkish footballer
 Serkan Balcı (born 1983), Turkish footballer
 Serkan Çalik (born 1986), Turkish footballer
 Serkan Çeliköz (born 1975), Turkish musician
 Serkan Erdoğan (born 1978), Turkish basketball player
 Serkan İnan (born 1986), Swedish basketball player of Turkish descent
 Serkan Kaya (born 1984), Turkish marathon runner
 Serkan Kırıntılı (born 1985), Turkish footballer
 Serkan Köse (born 1976), Swedish politician
 Serkan Kurtuluş (born 1990), Turkish footballer
 Serkan Özdemir (born 1976), Turkish footballer
 Serkan Özkaya (born 1973), Turkish artist
 Serkan Özsoy (born 1978), Turkish footballer
 Serkan Şahin (born 1988), Turkish footballer
 Serkan Yıldık (born 1982), Turkish footballer

Places
  Serkan, Iran, a city in Hamadan Province, Iran

Turkish masculine given names